Acrocylindropepsin (Acrocylindrium proteinase, Acrocylindrium acid proteinase) is an enzyme. This enzyme catalyses the following chemical reaction

 Preference for hydrophobic residues at P1 and P1'. Action on the B chain of insulin is generally similar to that of pepsin A, but it also cleaves Leu6-Cys(SO3H), Glu21-Arg and Asn3-Gln, although not Gln4-His

This enzyme is present in fungus Acrocylindrium sp.

References

External links 
 

EC 3.4.23